"Radio Wall of Sound" is a song by the British rock band Slade, released in October 1991 as the first single from their compilation album Wall of Hits. Written and produced by bassist Jim Lea, the single reached  21 on the UK Singles Chart. It remained in the top 100 for five weeks and became Slade's last hit single, discounting later chartings of "Merry Xmas Everybody".

Background
After their contract with RCA expired in 1987, Slade decided to take an 18-month break. Although they announced their intentions to record a new album, these plans did not materialise. Later, in 1991, their former label Polydor approached them with the idea of recording two new singles to promote a compilation album Wall of Hits. The two singles, "Radio Wall of Sound" and "Universe", were soon completed, with the former being released in October 1991. It reached No. 21 in the UK, earning the band their twenty-fourth Top 40 single and their first Top 40 hit since 1984. It was even voted the 'Single of the Week' by listeners on Simon Mayo's BBC Radio 1 show. As part of the deal with Polydor, if both "Radio Wall of Sound" and the follow-up single "Universe" were successful, a new studio album would be recorded. However, "Universe" failed to chart over Christmas, and Slade disbanded in 1992.

"Radio Wall of Sound" was originally a solo song by Lea, who had completed much of the recording before it became a Slade tune. He had first mentioned it in a 1990 fan club interview: "It sounds just like Slade, even my brother Frank says it sounds like Slade." In 1991, when Holder attempted to record his vocals, the band realised that Lea's existing recording was not in his key. As a result, Lea performed the lead vocal, with Holder joining in during the chorus. To provide the DJ voice-over parts in the song, the band approached the broadcaster/presenter Mike Read. Recalling the song in his autobiography Seize the Day, Read said: "They felt that the song needed a punchy American-style DJ delivery to give it some pace, so they asked if I'd pop up to the studio in north London."

Describing the song as a "more commercial, good instant rock track", Holder said of the single's performance, in a 1992 fan club interview: "It wouldn't have needed that many sales to have reached that position, not a vast amount. The initial shipping out to the shops was around 30,000 copies, I think, which is a good pre-order figure, good enough to go Top 40 first week out. The problem was sustaining the momentum after using up all the available TV's there was nowhere else to go. We couldn't get on Wogan, which would have helped, so really that was all the TV possible." In a 2000 interview with Mojo, Lea recalled of the song: "Our last hit was "Radio Wall of Sound", which I wrote and sang. The others thought it was a load of shit. Towards the end the records were completely my songs. I'd taken control and it didn't feel like a band any more. All the fun had gone out of it, so I started getting into the property business, and took a psychology course at college."

Release
"Radio Wall of Sound" was released by Polydor Records on 7" vinyl, CD and cassette in the UK and across Europe. In the UK, the single was also released on 12" vinyl. The B-side, "Lay Your Love on the Line", written by guitarist Dave Hill and ex-Wizzard keyboardist Bill Hunt, was exclusive to the single and would later appear on the band's 2007 compilation B-Sides. On the 12" and CD formats of the single, the band's 1973 hit "Cum On Feel the Noize" was also included as a second B-side.

Promotion
A music video was filmed to promote "Radio Wall of Sound", which was directed by William Clark and filmed in September 1991. The video was set on the roof-top of a radio station and featured an appearance from disc jockey Mike Read. Towards the end of the video, the radio tower on the roof of the building explodes. In the UK, the band performed the song on Top of the Pops and Motormouth.

Critical reception
Upon release, John Millard of News of the World commented: "Slade are still very, very noisy. October's hit "Radio Wall of Sound", was a less-than-gentle reminder of Slade's raucous, stomping heyday in the seventies." In the 2013 book Yeah Yeah Yeah: The Story of Modern Pop, author Bob Stanley described the song as a "stellar moment" in the band's latter-day career.

Track listings
7-inch single
 "Radio Wall of Sound" – 3:47
 "Lay Your Love on the Line" – 3:09

Cassette single
 "Radio Wall of Sound" – 3:47
 "Lay Your Love on the Line" – 3:09

12-inch single
 "Radio Wall of Sound" – 3:47
 "Lay Your Love on the Line" – 3:09
 "Cum On Feel the Noize" – 4:31

CD single
 "Radio Wall of Sound" – 3:47
 "Lay Your Love on the Line" – 3:09
 "Cum On Feel the Noize" – 4:31

Personnel
Slade
 Noddy Holder – vocals
 Jim Lea – lead vocals, bass, producer
 Dave Hill – lead guitar
 Don Powell – drums

Additional personnel
 Mike Read – DJ voice
 The Leisure Process – design

Charts

Cover versions
 In 2001, English vocalist/musician Mick White recorded a version of the track for the tribute album Slade Remade.

References

1991 singles
1991 songs
Slade songs
Songs written by Jim Lea
Polydor Records singles
Song recordings produced by Jim Lea